Saint-Henri, Quebec may refer to:
 Saint-Henri, Montreal, a neighbourhood of Montreal, Quebec
 Saint-Henri, Chaudière-Appalaches, Quebec, a municipality of Quebec in the vicinity of Lévis